Laughery Island, also called Laughery's Island, is a privately owned alluvial island in the Ohio River in Boone County, Kentucky. The island is named after Archibald Lochry, the leader of an ill-fated group of Pennsylvania militiamen who were attacked near the island by Native Americans in 1781 during the American Revolutionary War, a battle known as Lochry's Defeat.

References
Boone County Heritage

Landforms of Boone County, Kentucky
River islands of Kentucky
Islands of the Ohio River
Private islands of the United States